Torula (Cyberlindnera jadinii) is a species of yeast.

Use
Torula, in its inactive form (usually labeled as torula yeast), is widely used as a flavoring in processed foods and pet foods.  It is often grown on wood liquor, a byproduct of paper production, which is rich in wood sugars (xylose). It is pasteurized and spray-dried to produce a fine, light grayish-brown powder with a slightly yeasty odor and gentle, slightly meaty taste.

Cyberlindnera jadinii (which in these contexts is often still labelled with its synonym Candida utilis) can be used, in a blend of various other yeasts, as secondary cheese starter culture "... to inoculate pasteurised milk, which mimic the natural yeast flora of raw milk and improve cheese flavour. Other functions of the added yeast organisms are the neutralisation of the curd (lactate degradation) and galactose consumption."

Like the flavor enhancer monosodium glutamate (MSG), torula is rich in glutamic acid. Therefore, it has become a popular replacement among manufacturers wishing to eliminate MSG or hide flavor enhancer usage in an ingredients list. It also enables the marketing of "all-natural" ingredients.

Torula finds accepted use in Europe and California for the organic control of olive flies. When dissolved in water, it serves as a food attractant, with or without additional pheromone lures, in McPhail and OLIPE traps, which drown the insects. In field trials in Sonoma County, California, mass trappings reduced crop damage to an average of 30% compared to almost 90% in untreated controls.

See also

Nutritional yeast

References

Candida (fungus)
Yeasts
Fungi described in 1926